Bural was an airline based in Ulan-Ude, Russia. It operated trunk and regional passenger services. Its main base was Ulan-Ude Airport.

History 
The airline was established in 1933 as Buryatia Air Enterprise. It became independent in 1993 and was formerly known as Buryatia Airlines. Since 2002, the airline has curtailed its operations including services to Moscow-Domodedovo; and retiring many of its aircraft including Tu-154M, Il-62M, L-410 and An-26, due to large financial losses.
The airline went defunct in 2017, due to failure to follow the laws in the technical service of the aircraft. The regional flights across Buryatia to Taksimo and Nizhneangarsk were served by Angara Airlines instead.

Fleet 

The Bural fleet included the following aircraft in August 2015:

Destinations

Bagdarin — Bagdarin Airport
Irkutsk - Irkutsk Airport
Kyzyl - Kyzyl Airport (operated for Center-South to Moscow)
Nizhneangarsk — Nizhneangarsk Airport
Taksimo — Taksimo Airport
Ulan-Ude — Ulan-Ude Airport Hub

Codeshares
The airlines has codeshares with:
Centre-South (suspended)
PANH (as affiliate)
Yakutia Airlines

Incidents

1 October 2010 - AN-2 Uakit - Bagdarin - In flight at an altitude of 2,300 meters with very poor weather conditions and too little fuel left, the pilot decided to carry out an emergency landing. Passengers and copilot received injuries of varying severity when leaving the aircraft.

References 

Defunct airlines of Russia
Airlines established in 1993
Airlines disestablished in 2017
Companies based in Ulan-Ude
Former Aeroflot divisions
Russian companies established in 1993